Śląsk is the Polish name of Silesia.

Śląsk may also refer to:
 Śląsk Song and Dance Ensemble
 Śląsk Świętochłowice
 Śląsk Wrocław
 Śląsk Wrocław II
 Śląsk Wrocław (basketball)
 Śląsk Wrocław (handball)
 Śląsk Wrocław (women)

See also 
 Silesia (disambiguation)